Gherla Prison is a penitentiary located in the Romanian city of Gherla, in Cluj County. The prison dates from 1785; it is infamous for the treatment of its political inmates, especially during the Communist regime. In Romanian slang the generic word for a prison is "gherlǎ", after the institution.

History

Early years
The basic structure came from the fortress of Gherla or "Szamos-uj-var" (equivalent to transliteration from Hungarian, meaning "New castle on the Szamos") built around 1540 by George Martinuzzi, archbishop, cardinal and Imperial Treasurer of the Habsburg Empire.

Through the Imperial Decree of Joseph II, Holy Roman Emperor, dated October 20, 1785 this fortress was transformed into "Carcer Magni Principatus Transilvanie" (The Major Prison of Transylvanian Principality).

Throughout its history under the Austrian Empire, then Austro-Hungarian Empire, Hungary and finally Romania the penitentiary also hosted various industrial activities.    Near the prison a large cemetery holds the bodies of many inmates, including Sándor Rózsa, a well-known local "Robin Hood".

Communist era

Many Romanian military officers who had initially fought against the Soviet Army in World War II were incarcerated in Gherla Prison by the Communist regime after the end of the war. Many of the anti-Communist opposition figures spent jail time or disappeared forever into this prison.

Gherla Prison has a very large underground area. The number of inmates increased from 783 at the end of 1948 to around 4,500 in July 1959, however it then decreased to 600 by the end of 1964. According to a study done by the International Centre for Studies into Communism, 20.3% of all political prisoners in Communist Romania did some time at Gherla Prison.

The prison (called by the locals the "Yellow House") was very imposing. To the south was a cemetery, and next to it, a smaller one, for detainees dying at the prison. The fortress was surrounded by a 4-meter high wall, topped by  several watchtowers with armed soldiers on guard. Next to the wall was a 3-meter wide space, fenced with a 2-meter high barbed wire fence. At the front entrance was the one-story administration building, and from this building, through a vaulted door, one reached the two courtyards, paved with stones. The main building had two entrances, one to the inner courtyard and the other to the workshop courtyard; the inner courtyard had a gate to the south leading to the workshops.

In June 1958 a group of prisoners—consisting mostly of young men who had tried to escape to Yugoslavia, and had either been caught or returned to Romania—rebelled, asking for a more humane treatment.  The disturbance was quickly put down by the authorities, and the rebellious inmates were subjected to terrible beatings and torture. In an interview with Adevărul, an ex-detainee, Constantin Vlasie, recounts how the guards at Gherla Prison "were evil. They made us eat feces, we slept on the floor, they beat our feet until we fainted."  He went on: "They wanted to break up our morale. They had evil methods to make us renounce our faith and worship them instead." Another ex-prisoner, Mihai Stăuceanu (arrested for being a border-jumper), recalls: "The detention regime at Gherla was probably very similar to the extermination regime applied in the Nazi camps: 10 to 12 hours of physical work on a construction site, which was cordoned off with double fences of barbed-wire and with guarding towers, exactly like those to be found at the border."

Current use 
The penitentiary is in service today as a "Maximum Security Penitentiary". It also houses a museum, which opened in 1997. As of December 2020, there are 979 detainees at Gherla, of which 242 have retained their right to vote; at the 2020 legislative elections, 191 of those exercised that right.

Notable inmates
This is a partial list of notable inmates of Gherla Prison; the symbol † indicates those who died there.

References 

Prisons in Romania
Buildings and structures in Gherla
Human rights abuses in Romania
Political repression in Romania